Auguston Leonard (born 3 March 1991 in Boksburg, Gauteng) is a South African association football midfielder and striker for Mthatha Bucks.

Leonard hails from Reiger Park, Boksburg.

References

External links

1991 births
South African soccer players
Living people
Association football forwards
Association football midfielders
Moroka Swallows F.C. players
Bloemfontein Celtic F.C. players
People from Boksburg
Sportspeople from Gauteng